Dumitru Dron (born 30 October 1893, Cucioaia, Telenești – died 22 February 1977, Simeria, Hunedoara County, Romania) was a Bessarabian politician, a deputy in Sfatul Țării, mandate between 7 February 1918 and 27 November 1918. He was a member of the budget committee.

Biography 

He served as Member of the Moldovan Parliament (1917–1918).

Bibliography 
Gheorghe E. Cojocaru, Sfatul Țării: itinerar, Civitas, Chişinău, 1998, 
Mihai Taşcă, Sfatul Țării şi actualele autorităţi locale, "Timpul de dimineaţă", no. 114 (849), June 27, 2008 (page 16)

External links 
 Arhiva pentru Sfatul Tarii
 Deputaţii Sfatului Ţării şi Lavrenti Beria

Notes

Moldovan MPs 1917–1918
1893 births
1977 deaths